Montale is one of three towered peaks overlooking the city of San Marino, the capital of San Marino. The other two are  De La Fratta and Guaita.

Overview
Montale is the smallest of the three peaks of Monte Titano. The tower on the peak was constructed in the 14th century, and unlike the other two towers on the mount, it is not open to the public. It is thought to have been constructed to give protection against the increasing power of the Malatesta family in that region.  It was also used as a prison, and accordingly, the only entrance to the tower is a door about seven metres from ground level, which was common for prison architecture of the time.

It is one of the three towers depicted on both the national flag and coat of arms.

References

See also
Guaita (1st tower)
Cesta (2nd tower)
Three Towers of San Marino
City of San Marino

Mountains of San Marino
Buildings and structures in the City of San Marino
Towers in San Marino